Frank Strafaci (April 24, 1916 – February 19, 1988) was an American amateur golfer, who competed against the top amateurs of his time. He is remembered as one of Brooklyn's top amateur golfers.

Career
Strafaci was born and raised in Brooklyn, New York. He started his dominance on the amateur scene at Dyker Beach Golf Course in 1935 when he joined the Shoreview Golf Club. He won the U.S. Amateur Public Links in 1935. He won the Shoreview's Club Championship in 1936 and again in 1938. Over the next 15 years he dominated amateur golf in the area. He won the Long Island Golf Association Amateur Championship five times, the Metropolitan Amateur seven times, the North and South Amateur twice and the Richardson Invitational Championship twice. He also took his talents overseas, playing in the British and French Amateur Championships.

In 1940, Strafaci qualified for the U.S. Open. Shortly after qualifying, Strafaci learned Ben Hogan did not qualify but would be the first alternate. On May 27, a few weeks before the Open was to be held at the Canterbury Golf Club in Ohio, Strafaci issued Hogan an "Insurance Policy". In a letter to Hogan, Strafaci told him "Go ahead to Cleveland and get ready for the Open Championship. I'll see to it that you get in." Strafaci believed Hogan one of the best players in the World should be in the Open. By his own admission, Strafaci did not like his game even though he qualified. With no other player withdrawing, Strafaci withdrew on June 6 from the Open which enabled Hogan to play. Hogan was in contention all four rounds and would go on to finish T5.

In 1954, Strafaci played in the U.S. Amateur and had a very interesting first match opponent named Arnold Palmer; this was Palmer's final amateur appearance before turning professional. Palmer later stated that his toughest match was against Strafaci, who was all square with him entering the 17th hole. Palmer eventually beat Strafaci 1-up and went on to win the championship.

In 1957, Strafaci teamed up with his brother Thomas, the head professional at Dyker Beach Golf Club to capture the Long Island Golf Associations Amateur-Professional Championship at Nassau Country Club. This would be Frank’s second victory in this event winning it also in 1938 with professional Jimmy Hines who was the head professional at Lakeville Country Club. This event was also won in 1933 at Lido Golf Club by Strafaci’s older brother Ralph who teamed with Wiffy Cox who was the head professional at Dyker Beach GC at the time.

Strafaci semi-retired from amateur golf in the late 1950s and became Executive Director of the Florida Golf Association. In 1960 he became the Director of Golf at the famed Doral Country Club. He has been credited with naming the course the "Blue Monster". He continued to live in Florida until his death in 1988.

Family
Strafaci was one of five brothers, all of whom were top amateur golfers. His brother, Thomas U. Strafaci, was the only brother to turn professional and became the head golf pro with his son Thomas Strafaci, Jr. at Dyker Beach Golf Course in Brooklyn. His older brother Dominic was the 1941 MGA Public Links Champion winning the title at Bethpage Black.

Strafaci had one son also named Frank and a daughter named Cathy. Both of whom currently reside in Florida.

Strafaci's grandson, Tyler Strafaci, won the 2020 North and South Amateur at Pinehurst #2 just like his did grandfather in both 1938 and 1939. He also won the 2020 U.S. Amateur.

Amateur wins (27)
1935 U.S. Amateur Public Links
1938,1941,1947,1949,1951 Long Island Amateur
1952,1953 Long Island Golf Association - Richardson Invitational
1938,1939,1945,1946,1947,1950,1954 Metropolitan Amateur
1938,1939 North and South Amateur
1938,1957 Long Island Golf Association - Amateur/Professional Championship
1937 Hochster Memorial Tournament at Quaker Ridge CC
1936,1938 Shoreview Men's Golf Club - Club Champion
1940,1941 Dixie Amateur
1952,1954 Long Island Golf Association - Club Team Championship
1957 Florida State Amateur Championship

Other career highlights
1938, 1950 Masters Tournament participant
1937, 1946 U.S. Open participant
1953 Western Amateur medalist
1933 Long Island Junior Championship medalist

Results in major championships

Note: Strafaci never played in The Open Championship or the PGA Championship.

NT = no tournament
WD = withdrew
"T" indicates a tie for a place
R256, R128, R64, R32, R16, QF, SF = round in which player lost in match play

Source for The Masters:  www.masters.com

Source for U.S. Open and U.S. Amateur: USGA Championship Database

Source for 1950 British Amateur:  The Glasgow Herald, May 24, 1950, pg. 7.

Source for 1951 British Amateur:  The Glasgow Herald, May 22, 1951, pg. 6.

Source for 1952 British Amateur:  The Glasgow Herald, May 30, 1952, pg. 2.

Source for 1953 British Amateur:  The Glasgow Herald, May 28, 1953, pg. 4.

Source for 1954 British Amateur:  The Glasgow Herald, May 27, 1954, pg. 4.

Source for 1955 British Amateur:  The Glasgow Herald, June 2, 1955, pg. 4.

Source for 1956 British Amateur:  The Glasgow Herald, May 30, 1956, pg. 4.

Source for 1957 British Amateur:  The Glasgow Herald, May 29, 1957, pg. 4.

Source for 1958 British Amateur:  The Glasgow Herald, June 5, 1958, pg. 4.

Source for “Blue Monster“ Naming: NY Times Online Edition March 16, 2008 Sports Section article by Larry Dorman Event’s Stars: Monster and Woods

References

Dominate Players, The History of the L.I.G.A., Longislandgolf.org Retrieved 10/15/2010
Long Island Golf Association Yearbook 2003-2004, Amateur Championship, Richardson Invitational Retrieved 10/18/2010
Metropolitan Amateur Past Winners, MGA.org Retrieved 10/18/2010
The Blue Monster, Miamiherald.com/2009/03/09, Retrieved 10/18/2010
Paul J Strafaci, President, Shoreview Golf Club, Retrieved 10/18/2010
Golf Anecdotes: From the Links of Scotland to Tiger Woods page 130, Retrieved 10/18/2010
NY Times June 1937 Hochster Winner, spider.nytimes.com/pay_1937, Retrieved 10/18/2010
MGAGolf.com 1941 MGA Public Links Winner.
DixieAmateur.com Past Champions
FSGA.org Past Amateur Champions

American male golfers
Amateur golfers
Golfers from New York (state)
1916 births
1988 deaths